Aric Jeremiah Holman (born July 11, 1997) is an American professional basketball player for Legia Warszawa of the Polish Basketball League. He played college basketball for the Mississippi State Bulldogs.

High school career
Holman played basketball at Owensboro High School in Owensboro, Kentucky. He was all state and won the state championship his senior year.

College career
Holman played for the Mississippi State Bulldogs men's basketball team under head coach Ben Howland from 2015 to 2019. He averaged 9.5 points, 6.2 rebounds, 1.2 assists, and 1.6 blocks per game as a senior at Mississippi State.

Professional career

Texas Legends (2019–2020)
After going undrafted in the 2019 NBA draft, Holman signed with the Los Angeles Lakers in July 2019. The Lakers waived Holman in August to make space for Dwight Howard on the training camp roster, but was subsequently claimed off waivers by the Dallas Mavericks. He was waived on October 16, 2019. Holman signed with the Texas Legends. He had 18 points in a 113–107 win over the Santa Cruz Warriors on November 26. Holman averaged 9.7 points, 4.3 rebounds, and 1.4 assists per game.

ratiopharm Ulm (2020–2021)
On August 10, 2020, Homan signed with ratiopharm Ulm of the German Basketball Bundesliga.

Austin Spurs (2021–2022)
In August 2021, Holman joined the Boston Celtics for the 2021 NBA summer league, missing one shot and taking 2 rebounds in 5 minutes at his debut, an 85–83 win against the Atlanta Hawks. On October 2, 2021, he signed with the San Antonio Spurs, but was waived the same day. On October 27, he signed with the Austin Spurs as an affiliate player.

On December 29, 2021, Holman signed a 10-day contract with the Miami Heat. However, he never played a game for the team. On January 9, 2022, he was reacquired by Austin.

Gigantes de Carolina (2022)
On April 7, 2022, Holman signed with Gigantes de Carolina from Puerto Rico.

Holman joined the Houston Rockets for the 2022 NBA Summer League.

Scaligera Basket Verona (2022–2023)
On August 3, 2022, he has signed with Scaligera Verona in the Serie A.

Legia Warszawa (2023–present)
On February 10, 2023, he signed with Legia Warszawa of the Polish Basketball League.

References

External links
Mississippi State Bulldogs bio

1997 births
Living people
American expatriate basketball people in Germany
American men's basketball players
Austin Spurs players
Basketball players from Kentucky
Centers (basketball)
Legia Warsaw (basketball) players
Mississippi State Bulldogs men's basketball players
Power forwards (basketball)
ratiopharm Ulm players
Scaligera Basket Verona players
Sportspeople from Owensboro, Kentucky
Texas Legends players